Aghcheh Kohel may refer to:
 Aghcheh Kohel, Maragheh, East Azerbaijan Province
 Aghcheh Kohel, Osku, East Azerbaijan Province
 Aghcheh Kohol, Ardabil Province